A scold's bridle, sometimes called a witch's bridle, a gossip's bridle, a brank's bridle, or simply branks, was an instrument of punishment, as a form of public humiliation. It was an iron muzzle in an iron framework that enclosed the head (although some bridles were masks that depicted suffering). It functioned to silence the wearer from speaking entirely, and caused extreme pain and physiological trauma to scare and intimidate the wearer into submission. The scold's bridle was overwhelmingly used on women, often at the request of husbands or other family members. This prevented speaking and resulted in many unpleasant side effects for the wearer, including excessive salivation and fatigue in the mouth. For extra humiliation, a bell could also be attached to draw in crowds. The wearer was then led around town by a leash.

Origin and purpose

England and Scotland
First recorded in Scotland in 1567, the branks were also used in England and its colonies. The kirk-sessions and barony courts in Scotland inflicted the contraption mostly on female transgressors and women considered to be rude, nags or common scolds.

Branking (in Scotland and the North of England) was designed as a mirror punishment for shrews or scolds—women of the lower classes whose speech was deemed "riotous" or "troublesome"—by preventing them from speaking. This also gives it its other name, 'The Gossip's Bridle'.

It was also used as corporal punishment for other offences, notably on female workhouse inmates. The person to be punished was placed in a public place for additional humiliation and sometimes beaten. The Lanark Burgh Records  record a typical example of the punishment being used: "Iff evir the said Elizabeth salbe fund [shall be found] scolding or railling … scho salbe sett [she shall sit] upone the trone in the brankis and be banishit [banished of] the toun thaireftir [thereafter]" (1653 Lanark B. Rec. 151).

Though primarily used on women, the Burgh Records of Scotland's major towns reveal that the branks were at times used on men as well: "Patrick Pratt sall sit … bound to the croce [cross] of this burgh, in the brankis lockit [branks lockèd]" (1591 Aberd. B Rec. II. 71) /  "He shall be put in the branks be the space of xxiiij houres thairafter" (1559 (c 1650) Dundee B. Laws 19).

When the branks was placed on the "gossiper's" head, they could be led through town to show that they had committed an offence or scolded too often. This was intended to humiliate them into "repenting" their "riotous" actions. A spike inside the gag prevented any talking since any movement of the mouth could cause a severe piercing of the tongue. When wearing the device, it was impossible for the person either to eat or speak. Other branks included an adjustable gag with a sharp edge, causing any movement of the mouth to result in laceration of the tongue.

In Scotland, branks could also be permanently displayed in public by attaching them, for example, to the town cross, tron or tolbooth. Then, the ritual humiliation would take place, with the miscreant on public show. Displaying the branks in public was intended to remind the populace of the consequences of any rash action or slander. Whether the person was paraded or simply taken to the point of punishment, the process of humiliation and expected repentance was the same. Time spent in the bridle was normally allocated by the kirk session, in Scotland, or a local magistrate.

Quaker women were sometimes punished with the branks by the non-Quaker authorities for preaching their religious doctrine in public places.

Jougs were similar in their effect to a pillory, but did not restrain the sufferer from speaking. They were generally used in both England and Scotland in the 16th and 17th centuries.

The New World
The scold's bridle did not see much use in the New World, though Olaudah Equiano recorded that it was commonly used to control Virginia slaves in the mid-18th century.

Escrava Anastacia ("Anastacia the female slave") is a Brazilian folk saint said to have died from wearing a punitive iron muzzle.

Historical examples 
Scotland
In 1567, Bessie Tailiefeir (pronounced Telfer) allegedly slandered Baillie Thomas Hunter in Edinburgh, saying that he was using false measures. She was sentenced to be "brankit" and fixed to the cross for one hour.

England
Two bridles were bought for use by the magistrates of Walsall in the 17th century, but it is not clear what happened to them or even whether they were ever used.

In Walton on Thames, Surrey, a replica of a scold's bridle that was stolen in 1965, dated to 1633, is in a dedicated cabinet in the vestry of the church, with the inscription "Chester presents Walton with a bridle, To curb women's tongues that talk too idle." Oral tradition is this Chester lost a fortune due to a woman's gossip, and presented the instrument of restraint or torture out of anger and spite. The church states it came to the parish in 1723 from Chester.

Mediæval London (1906) named six instances "of branks preserved, I believe, to this day ... at Worcester, Ludlow, Newcastle-under-Lyme, Oxford, Shrewsbury ... Lichfield ... and many other places".

As late as 1856 such an item was used at Bolton-le-Moors, Lancashire.

In fiction 
The Scold's Bridle is the title of a novel by Minette Walters, where a scold's bridle is a key element in the plot.

In Brimstone (2016 film) actress Carice van Houten is wearing a scold's bridle in some scenes.

See also 
 Jougs
 Shrew's fiddle
 Stool of repentance
 Slave iron bit

References

External links 

  Bygone Punishments of Scotland by William Andrews 1899 on electricscotland

Modern instruments of torture
Physical restraint
European instruments of torture
Violence against women
Punitive masks
Masks in Europe
Torture in Scotland
Torture in England
Women in Scotland
Women in England
Iron objects